Ondre Kulam is a 1956 Indian Tamil-language film directed by N. Krishnaswamy. Edited by M.S. Parthasarathy. The film stars R. S. Manohar and Madhuri Devi. This is a 1956 award-winning  Tamil film and this film title was named by former Tamil Nadu Chief Minister K.Kamaraj.

Cast 
List adapted from the database of Film News Anandan.

Male cast
R. S. Manohar
S. V. Sahasranamam
K. Sarangapani
J. P. Chandrababu

Female cast
Maduri Devi
K. R. Chellam
T. V. Kumudhini

Production 
The film was produced and directed by N. Krishnaswamy. Sathasiva Brahmam wrote the story while the dialogues were penned by S. D. Sundharam, V. Seetharaman and Ku. Sa. Krishnamoorthy. Balu was in charge of Cinematography while the editing was done by M.S. Parthasarathy. Art direction was K. R. Sarma and the still photography was done by S. V. Gopal Rao.

Soundtrack 
Music was composed by M. V. Ranga Rao and S. V. Venkatraman while the lyrics were penned by Ku. Sa. Krishnamoorthy, Surabhi, and V. Seetharaman. One song by Subramania Bharathiyar and another song by Poet Auwaiyar were included in the film. Playback singers are Sirkazhi Govindarajan,  S. V. Venkatraman, V. N. Sundaram, S. V. Ponnusamy, A. P. Komala, M. L. Vasanthakumari, N. L. Ganasaraswathi, Rani, M. S. Rajeswari, Jikki, Kalyani, Vasantha, Sundaramma and G. Kasthuri.

References 

Indian drama films
Films scored by S. V. Venkatraman
1950s Tamil-language films